WQDH-LD (channel 49) is a low-power television station in Wilmington, North Carolina, United States, broadcasting Shop LC. It is owned by HC2 Holdings and licensed to DTV America.

History 
The station's construction permit was issued on December 8, 2009, under the calls of W49DH-D, and changed to the current callsign of WQDH-LD on February 24, 2017.

On December 31, 2022, Azteca América ceased operations.

Subchannels
The station's digital signal is multiplexed:

References

External links

Low-power television stations in the United States
LX (TV network) affiliates
GetTV affiliates
TeleXitos affiliates
Twist (TV network) affiliates
Innovate Corp.
Television stations in North Carolina
Television channels and stations established in 2019
2019 establishments in North Carolina